Barney Lewis Chavous (born March 22, 1951) is a former American football defensive end in the National Football League (NFL). He was drafted in the second round (36th overall) of the 1973 NFL Draft by the Denver Broncos after playing college football for South Carolina State University. He was selected by the Associated Press as a first-team defensive end on the 1972 Little All-America college football team.

He played his entire NFL career with the Broncos from 1973-1985.  He ranks third on the Broncos' all-time sacks list with 75 and is tied with Tom Jackson for third in Broncos' career starts with 177.

Chavous was the head football coach at T. W. Josey High School in Augusta, Georgia. Chavous is the uncle of former Minnesota Vikings cornerback Corey Chavous.
Now he works as a team sports coach at Tutt Middle school in Augusta, Georgia.

References

1951 births
Living people
American football defensive linemen
People from Aiken, South Carolina
Denver Broncos players
South Carolina State Bulldogs football players
Players of American football from South Carolina
African-American players of American football
21st-century African-American people
20th-century African-American sportspeople